Parker's Ford, also known as Old Parkerford, is a national historic district located in East Vincent Township, Chester County, Pennsylvania. The district includes 5 contributing buildings, 3 contributing site, and 1 contributing structure. The buildings are a tavern (1766), stable building, and three houses.  It was the site of a grist mill and sawmill by 1720.

It was added to the National Register of Historic Places in 1983.

References

Historic districts on the National Register of Historic Places in Pennsylvania
Buildings and structures in Chester County, Pennsylvania
National Register of Historic Places in Chester County, Pennsylvania